The All-Ireland Senior B Hurling Championship 2002 was the 24th staging of Ireland's secondary hurling knock-out competition.  Laois won the championship, beating Wicklow 2-20 to 2-7 in the final at Semple Stadium, Thurles.

Sources

 Donegan, Des, The Complete Handbook of Gaelic Games (DBA Publications Limited, 2005).

References

2002
2002 in hurling